Postman is a 2000 Indian Telugu-language family drama film directed by Muppalaneni Siva and starring Mohan Babu, Soundarya and Raasi.

Cast 
Mohan Babu as Vishnu
Soundarya as Archana
Raasi as Sirisha
Kota Srinivasa Rao as Ramkoti
AVS
M. S. Narayana
Brahmanandam
Ali

Soundtrack 
The songs were composed by Vandemataram Srinivas and released under the label Supreme Recording.

Release and reception 
The film released on 13 January 2000 coinciding with Sankranti alongside Kalisundam Raa and Vamsoddharakudu. The film was a box office failure.

The film was reviewed by Zamin Ryot. Jeevi of Idlebrain.com gave the film a rating of four out of five and wrote that "It has got all the ingredients one expect from a good film. There is a treat for the Telugu language lovers in this film".

References

External links 

2000 films
2000s Telugu-language films

Indian romantic drama films
Films directed by Muppalaneni Shiva
Films scored by Vandemataram Srinivas